Mark Anthony Miloscia (born September 13, 1958) is an American politician and former public school teacher who served in the Washington State Senate from 2015 to 2019. A Democrat for more than twenty years, in 2014 he switched to the Republican Party and ran for election to represent the 30th Legislative District in the state senate - winning by more than ten percentage points. In 2016, Miloscia ran for state auditor as a Republican, he lost the general election to Democrat Pat McCarthy by 5 percentage points. He represented the 30th legislative district for seven terms, from 1999 to 2013, in the Washington House of Representatives. He was endorsed by The Seattle Times newspaper for re-election in 2018.

Personal life
Miloscia was born in Biloxi, Mississippi, and lived there until the age of six when his family moved to New York City. He lived with his family in New York City until graduating from Francis Lewis High School. 

He is a retired officer of the United States Air Force. He was a B-52 pilot and a contract manager for the Air Force for 10 years. He holds a Bachelor of Science in Engineering from the United States Air Force Academy, a Master of Arts (MA) degree from Chapman University in clinical psychology, and a Master of Business Administration (MBA) degree from the University of North Dakota. He has also completed the Leadership Program at the Taubman Center for State and Local Government at John F. Kennedy School of Government at Harvard University.

He has resided in Auburn, Washington, and then Federal Way, Washington with his wife Meschell, his three children, and his grandchildren for the last 25 years.

Professional career
Miloscia is a lobbyist for the Washington State Catholic Conference of Bishops. He is a substitute teacher for the Federal Way School District and the Roman Catholic Archdiocese of Seattle. He has also worked as the industrial services director for Goodwill Industries in Tacoma, the executive director of Federal Way Youth and Family Services, and as a commissioner for the Lakehaven Utility District.

 he sits on the board of directors for the Federal Way Boys and Girls Club, is a member of St. Vincent's Knights of Columbus, and is a member of the Federal Way Chamber of Commerce.

In 2018 he became the executive director of the Family Policy Institute of Washington, a Family Research Council (FRC) operating under the umbrella of James Dobson's Focus on the Family.

Political career
Miloscia served seven terms in the Washington State House of Representatives as a Democrat. He was elected in 1998 from the 30th Legislative District, an area that includes Federal Way, Algona, and portions of Auburn, Pacific, Milton, and Des Moines.

On September 15, 2011, Miloscia announced his candidacy to run as a Democrat to replace retiring Washington State Auditor Brian Sonntag. Miloscia came under fire within his own party for his conservative positions on abortion and same-sex marriage, and he failed to receive its nomination. Miloscia was not among the top-two vote-getters in Washington's blanket primary system, garnering less than 10% of the vote, and thus did not appear on the November general election ballot. Fellow Democratic State Representative Troy Kelley was elected as state auditor in November 2012. Miloscia's seat in the legislature was won by Republican Federal Way City Councilperson Linda Kochmar.

While serving as a representative, Miloscia worked as a substitute teacher when the legislature was not in session. As of March 2014, Miloscia announced his candidacy for State Senate in the 30th Legislative District as a Republican. 

On March 6, 2014, Miloscia switched to the Republican Party when he announced his candidacy for the State Senate in the 30th Legislative District in 2014 - an election he ultimately won by more than 11 points.

Miloscia is currently running for Washington secretary of state in the 2022 special election.

Awards 
  2017: Third Class of the Order of Merit of the Ukraine

Electoral history

References

1958 births
21st-century American politicians
Aviators from Washington (state)
Chapman University alumni
Francis Lewis High School alumni
Living people
Members of the Washington House of Representatives
People from Auburn, Washington
People from Federal Way, Washington
Politicians from Biloxi, Mississippi
Politicians from New York City
Recipients of the Order of Merit (Ukraine), 3rd class
United States Air Force Academy alumni
United States Air Force officers
University of North Dakota alumni
Washington (state) Democrats
Washington (state) Republicans
Washington (state) state senators